The Burning Question is an Australian television series which aired from 1957 to 1960 on Sydney station ATN-7. It was a panel discussion series with Malcolm Mackay as moderator. Topics in the series included "should comics be banned?", "should the church remarry divorced people?", "will inflation increase?", and "can our roads be made safe?".

References

External links

1957 Australian television series debuts
1960 Australian television series endings
Australian non-fiction television series
Black-and-white Australian television shows
Australian live television series
Australian television talk shows